Nicopolis (Nikópolis) was the name of Emmaus (Ammaoûs; , Imwas) under the Roman Empire until the conquest of Palestine by the Rashidun Caliphate in 639. The site of the ancient city now lies between Tel Aviv and Jerusalem in Israel. A Palestinian Arab village occupied the site until the Six-Day War in 1967, when it was destroyed. The archaeological site has been cared for by a resident French Catholic community since 1993 but are formally organized as a part of Canada Park under the general supervision of the Israel Nature and Parks Authority.

Location

Emmaus Nicopolis appears on Roman geographical maps. The geographical position of Emmaus is described in the Jerusalem Talmud, Tractate Sheviit 9.2:
 From Bet Horon to the Sea is one domain. Yet is it one domain without regions? Rabbi Johanan said, "Still there is Mountain, Lowland, and Valley. From Bet Horon to Emmaus it is Mountain, from Emmaus to Lydda Lowland, from Lydda to the Sea Valley. Then there should be four stated? They are adjacent."

Names

The name Emmaus is thought to refer to the Hebrew ḥammat, meaning "hot spring," although this remains uncertain. During the late Second Temple period, Emmaus was renamed Nicopolis ("City of Victory"), which it continued to use as late as the 6th-century Madaba Map. According to Sozomen (fl.400450), it was renamed by the Romans "in consequence of the conquest of Jerusalem and the victory over the Jews."

History

Ancient Israel
Due to its strategic position, Emmaus played an important administrative, military and economic role in history. The first mention of Emmaus occurs in the First Book of Maccabees, chapters 3–4, in the context of Judas Maccabeus and his revolt against the Greek Seleucid Empire in the 2nd century.  The first major battle of the revolt, the Battle of Emmaus, is traditionally believed to have occurred in this area, with the Seleucids establishing a fortified camp here from which to control the countryside. During the Hasmonean period, Emmaus became a regional administrative centre (toparchy) in the Ayalon Valley.

Roman Empire

Josephus Flavius mentions Emmaus in his writings several times. He speaks about the destruction of Emmaus by the Romans in the year 4. The importance of the city was recognized by the Emperor Vespasian, who established a fortified camp there in 68 to house the fifth ("Macedonian") legion, populating it with 800 veterans, though this may refer to Qalunya rather than Emmaus Nicopolis. Archaeological works indicate that the town was cosmopolitan, with a mixed Jewish, pagan and Samaritan population, the presence of the last group being attested by the remains of a Samaritan synagogue. In 130 or 131, the city was destroyed by an earthquake. In 132, the ruins of Emmaus fortress were briefly reconstructed by Judean rebels under Simon Bar Kokhba and used as a hideout during the revolt.

The city of Nicopolis was founded on the ruins of Emmaus in early 3rd century, after Julius Africanus, who said he had interviewed descendants of Jesus' relatives, headed an embassy to Rome and had an interview with the Roman emperor Elagabalus on behalf of Emmaus, then a small Palestinian village. St. Eusebius writes "Emmaus, whence was Cleopas who is mentioned by the Evangelist Luke. Today it is Nicopolis, a famous city of Palestine." In 222, a basilica was erected there, which was rebuilt first by the Byzantines and later modified by the Crusaders.

Byzantine Empire
During the Byzantine period Nicopolis became a large city and a bishopric. A substantial church complex was erected on the spot where tradition maintained the apparition of the risen Christ had occurred, a site which then became a place of pilgrimage, and whose ruins are still extant.

Muslim Caliphate
At the time of the Islamic conquest of Palestine, the main encampment of the Arab army was established in Emmaus, when a plague (ța'ūn) struck, carrying off many of Companions of the Prophet. This first encounter of the Arab armies with the chronic plagues of Syria was later referred to as the 'plague of 'Amawās', a and the event marked the decline of Emmaus Nicopolis. A well on the site still bears an inscription reading "the well of the plague" (bi'r aț-ța'ūn).

Kingdom of Jerusalem
During the Crusader period, the Christian presence resumed at Emmaus, and the Byzantine church was restored. However, the memory of the apparition of the risen Jesus at Emmaus also started to be celebrated in three other places in the Holy Land: Motza (c.  west of Jerusalem), Qubeibe (c.  northwest of Jerusalem), and Abu Ghosh (c.  west of Jerusalem).

Ottoman Empire
The Arab village of Imwas was identified once again as the biblical Emmaus and the Roman-Byzantine Nicopolis by scholars in the 19th century, including Edward Robinson(1838–1852), M.-V. Guérin (1868), Charles Simon Clermont-Ganneau (1874), and J.-B. Guillemot (1880–1887). Significantly, a local mystic named Saint Mariam of Jesus Crucified, a nun of the Carmelite monastery of Bethlehem, had a revelation while in ecstatic prayer in 1878 in which Jesus appeared to indicate Amwas was the Gospel Emmaus. "She came to the top of a knoll where, amid grass and thorns, there were some freestones leveled. Transported and moved, she turned toward her sisters [in religion], and said to them in a loud voice: 'This is truly the place where our Lord ate with His disciples.'" On the basis of this revelation, the holy place of Emmaus was acquired by the Carmelite order from the Muslims in 1878, excavations were carried out, and the flow of pilgrims to Emmaus resumed.

British Mandate
In 1930, the Carmelite Order built a monastery, the House of Peace, on the tract of land purchased in 1878. In November 1947, the United Nations Partition Plan for Palestine attributed the area to the Arab State. Prior to the outbreak of hostilities in the 1948 Arab–Israeli War, ʻImwâs had a population of 1,100 Arabs.

Jordan
Israelis and Jordanians fought during the battle of Latrun for the control of this strategic zone which blockaded the road to Jerusalem. As part of the outcome of the war the Palestinian village of Imwas, which lay on the site of Emmaus Nicopolis, fell within the West Bank territory under Jordanian rule.

Israeli Occupation
In 1967, after the Six-Day War the residents of Imwas Israeli forces expelled the population and the village was razed by bulldozers, leaving the Byzantine-crusader church, called in Arabic, al-Kenisah, intact in their cemetery. The Catholic congregation, the Community of the Beatitudes, renovated the site in 1967–1970 and opened the French Center for the Study of the Prehistory of the Land of Israel next to it where they were allowed to settle in 1993.

Subsequently, Canada Park was created in 1973, financed by the Jewish National Fund (JNF) of Canada, and included the plantation of a forest on the rubble of Imwas. The site became a favourite picnic ground for Israelis and the Latrun salient an area of Israeli commemoration of its War of Independence.

Archaeology
Archaeological excavations in Imwas started in the late 19th century and continue nowadays: Clermont-Ganneau (1874), J.-B. Guillemot (1883–1887), Dominican Fathers L.-H. Vincent & F.-M. Abel (1924–1930), Y. Hirschfeld (1975), M. Gichon  (1978), Mikko Louhivuori, M. Piccirillo, V. Michel, K.-H. Fleckenstein (since 1994). During excavations in Canada Park ( Ayalon forest) ruins of Emmaus fortifications from the Hasmonean era were discovered, along with a Roman bathhouse from the 3rd century CE, Jewish burial caves from the 1st century CE, Roman-Byzantine hydraulic installations, oil presses and tombs. Other findings were coins, oil lamps, vessels, jewellery. The eastern (rear) three-apsidal wall of the Byzantine church was cleared, with an external baptistery and polychrome mosaics, as well as walls of the Crusader church which were built against the central Byzantine apse (12th century). In the area of Emmaus, several Hebrew, Samaritan, Greek and Latin inscriptions carved on stones have been found.

Identification with the Gospel site
Most manuscripts of the Gospel of Luke which came down to us indicate the distance of 60 stadia (c. 11 km) between Jerusalem and Emmaus. However, there are several manuscripts which state the distance as 160 stadia (31 km). These include the uncial manuscripts א (Codex Sinaiticus), Θ, Ν, Κ, Π, 079 and cursive (minuscule) manuscripts 158, 175, 223, 237, 420, as well as ancient lectionaries and translations into Latin (some manuscripts of the Vetus Latina, high-quality manuscripts of the Vulgate), in Aramaic, Georgian and Armenian languages. The version of 60 stadia has been adopted for the printed editions of the Gospel of Luke since the 16th century. The main argument against the version of 160 stadia claims that it is impossible to walk such a distance in one day. In keeping with the principle of Lectio difficilior, lectio verior, the most difficult version is presumed to be genuine, since ancient copyists of the Bible were inclined to change the text in order to facilitate understanding, but not vice versa. It is possible to walk from Jerusalem to Emmaus and back in one day.

The ancient Jewish sources (1 Maccabees, Josephus Flavius, Talmud and Midrash) mention only one village called Emmaus in the area of Jerusalem: Emmaus of Ajalon Valley. For example, in the "Jewish War" (4, 8, 1) Josephus Flavius mentions that Vespasian placed the 5th Macedonian Legion in Emmaus. This has been confirmed by archaeologists who have discovered inscribed tombstones of the Legion's soldiers in the area of Emmaus. (The village of Motza, located 30 stadia (c. ) away from Jerusalem, is mentioned in medieval Greek manuscripts of the "Jewish war" of Josephus Flavius (7,6,6) under the name of Ammaus, apparently as a result of copyists' mistake).

The ancient Christian tradition of the Church fathers, as well as pilgrims to the Holy Land during the Roman-Byzantine period, unanimously recognized Nicopolis as the Emmaus in the Gospel of Luke (Origen (presumably), Eusebius of Caesarea, St. Jerome, Hesychius of Jerusalem, Theophanes the Confessor, Sozomen, Theodosius, etc.).

See also
Aelia Capitolina
Battle of Emmaus
Caesarea Maritima
Gezer
Imwas
Post-resurrection appearances of Jesus

References

Citations

Bibliography

Duvignau, P. 1937. Emmaüs, le site – le mystère, Paris, 
Fleckenstein, K.-H., M. Louhivuori, R. Riesner, "Emmaus in Judäa", Giessen-Basel, 2003..

Michel, V., "Le complexe ecclésiastique d'Emmaüs-Nicopolis", Paris, Sorbonne,1996–1997, pro manuscripto.

External links
 Emmaus Nicopolis, official site
Omnes Viae: From Jerusalem to Emmaus on the Peutinger Map

New Testament cities
Archaeological sites in the West Bank
Ancient Jewish Greek history
Former populated places in Southwest Asia
Ancient Jewish settlements of Judaea
State of Palestine in the Roman era